Mohammad Helmi Bin Remeli (born 24 March 1985 in Kedah) is a Malaysian professional footballer who plays and captains for Malaysia FAM League side D'AR Wanderers F.C. He mainly plays as a right back and also can play as a left back or a centre back.

In 2016, Helmi left Terengganu for Kuala Lumpur.

Helmi made his debut for Malaysia national team, when he was picked in the starting eleven for the friendly match against Hong Kong on 3 June 2011.

Career statistics

References

External links
 
 

1985 births
Living people
Malaysian footballers
Malaysia international footballers
Kuala Muda Naza F.C. players
Kuala Lumpur City F.C. players
Terengganu FC players
PKNS F.C. players
People from Kedah
Malaysia Super League players
Association football defenders